Labonte or Labonté is a surname. Notable people with the surname include:

Aaron Labonte (born 1983), English professional footballer
Benoît Labonté (born 1959), city councillor with the Vision Montréal party in Montreal, Quebec, Canada
Bobby Labonte (born 1964), American race car driver
Catherine Labonté, Canadian glass artist
Charline Labonté (born 1982), women's ice hockey player
Jean Labonté (born 1969), Canadian sledge hockey player
Julie Labonté (born 1990), Canadian track and field athlete
Justin Labonte (born 1981), former NASCAR Busch Series driver
Philip Labonte (born 1975), American musician, lead singer of the American metalcore band All That Remains
Richard Labonté (born 1949), Canadian writer and editor
Robert LaBonte, American curler
Terry Labonte (born 1956), Retired NASCAR driver and two-time NASCAR Winston Cup and IROC champion
Veronique Labonte (born 1980), Canadian road cyclist
Vincent Labonté (born 1987), Mauritian football player

See also
Labonte Motorsports, former part-time Winston Cup team and full-time Busch Series team